PRA1 family protein 3 is a protein that in humans is encoded by the ARL6IP5 gene.

Function 

Expression of this gene is affected by vitamin A. The encoded protein of this gene may be associated with the cytoskeleton. A similar protein in rats may play a role in the regulation of cell differentiation. The rat protein binds and inhibits the cell membrane glutamate transporter EAAC1. The expression of the rat gene is upregulated by retinoic acid, which results in a specific reduction in EAAC1-mediated glutamate transport. The disruption of the mouse gene results in increased neuronal glutathione content, neuroprotection against oxidative stress and a better performance in motor/spatial learning and memory tests than wild-type mice.

Interactions 

ARL6IP5 has been shown to interact with SLC1A1.

References

External links

Further reading